Cotacachi is a dormant volcano in the Western Cordillera of the northern Ecuadorian Andes, in the west of Imbabura Province, above the city of Cotacachi.

The summit of Cotacachi is located within the Cotacachi Cayapas Ecological Reserve. It was first climbed on 24 April 1880 by Edward Whymper, Jean-Antoine Carrel and Louis Carrel.

See also

 Lists of volcanoes
 List of volcanoes in Ecuador
 List of Ultras of South America

References

External links
 "Cotacachi" on Summitpost
 "Volcán Cotacachi, Ecuador" on Peakbagger
 

Geography of Imbabura Province
Volcanoes of Ecuador
Four-thousanders of the Andes
First 100 IUGS Geological Heritage Sites